Joseph Polossifakis (born August 21, 1990) is a Canadian male sabre fencer. Polossifakis is a multiple time Pan American Games medallist and is also a former Pan American Championships silver medallist.

Joseph Polossifakis qualified to represent his country at the 2016 Summer Olympics, by being ranked in the top two in the Americas, outside the top 14.

References

External links
 

1990 births
Living people
Canadian people of Greek descent
Canadian male sabre fencers
Fencers from Montreal
Fencers at the 2015 Pan American Games
Pan American Games silver medalists for Canada
Pan American Games bronze medalists for Canada
Fencers at the 2016 Summer Olympics
Olympic fencers of Canada
Pan American Games medalists in fencing
Fencers at the 2019 Pan American Games
Medalists at the 2015 Pan American Games
Medalists at the 2019 Pan American Games